Daniel Efland (born October 4, 1988) is an American professional stock car racing driver, engineer and crew chief who works for Petty GMS Motorsports as the engineer for the No. 43 Chevrolet Camaro ZL1 driven by Erik Jones in the NASCAR Cup Series. He formerly competed as a driver in USAR Pro Cup, what is now the NASCAR Xfinity Series, and the NASCAR Camping World Truck Series.

Racing career
From 1999–2002, Efland won 7 state championships as well as 5 National World Karting Association championships. Moving on to the Pro 4 Mod class at Florence Motor Speedway in 2002, he won the track championship as well as rookie of the year honors. He won his first late model race in 2005, and went on to win 8 more races in 2006.

In 2007, Efland made his Busch Series debut at New Hampshire International Speedway. Driving the No. 01 Chevrolet for JD Motorsports, he started 36th and finished 40th after retiring due to handling problems. He ran two more races that season and failed to finish either of them. In 2008, he returned to JD and competed in 18 races. Success was hard to find and he only managed a best finish of 23rd at Lowe's Motor Speedway.

Efland made two start and park efforts for Corrie Stott Racing in the Camping World Truck Series in 2009, finishing 33rd and 31st. Efland returned to the Nationwide Series to run a limited schedule in 2010 and 2011, scoring a best career finish of 16th at Darlington Raceway.

Efland planned to run a partial 2012 schedule in the No. 4 Chevrolet for JD Motorsports.

To date in 2012, Danny has finished both Nationwide Daytona races in 13th position. He also picked up a strong finish at Talladega in 16th position.

It was announced on January 21, 2013 that Efland would return to the No. 4 JD Motorsports Chevrolet in 27 of the 33 races for the 2013 NASCAR Nationwide Series season, but he was released from the team in late March. He also returned to the Truck Series at Kansas Speedway, driving the No. 6 for Eddie Sharp Racing.

In March 2014, Efland joined Richard Childress Racing, working as an engineer for the team's No. 33 Chevrolet in the Nationwide Series.

In 2022, Efland worked for Petty GMS Motorsports as the engineer for the No. 43 car driven by Erik Jones. In the race at Pocono, Efland served as the interim crew chief for the team after crew chief Dave Elenz was suspended for the race due to a rocker box assembly violation.

Personal life

Efland graduated with honors from Dutch Fork High School and graduated from the University of South Carolina with a degree in engineering.

Motorsports career results

NASCAR
(key) (Bold – Pole position awarded by qualifying time. Italics – Pole position earned by points standings or practice time. * – Most laps led.)

Nationwide Series

Camping World Truck Series 

 Season still in progress
 Ineligible for series points

References

External links
 
 
 

Living people
1988 births
Sportspeople from Columbia, South Carolina
Racing drivers from South Carolina
NASCAR drivers
CARS Tour drivers
University of South Carolina alumni
People from Irmo, South Carolina